Chaos or CHAOS may refer to:

Arts, entertainment and media

Fictional elements 
 Chaos (Kinnikuman)
 Chaos (Sailor Moon)
 Chaos (Sesame Park)
 Chaos (Warhammer)
 Chaos, in Fabula Nova Crystallis Final Fantasy
 Chaos, in Loom (video game)
 Chaos, a character in the Sonic the Hedgehog series
 Chaos, in The Power of Five
 chaos, in Xenosaga
 Chaos, in King of Cards
 Chaos, in Nanatsu no Taizai

Film and television 
 Chaos (2000 film), a Japanese mystery-thriller
 Chaos (2001 film), a French comedy-drama
 Chaos (2005 action film), an action thriller
 Chaos (2005 horror film), an American horror film
 Chaos, a 2006 Polish film directed by Xawery Zulawski
 Chaos (2008 film), a Hong Kong action thriller
 Kaos (film) (Chaos in the U.S.), a 1984 Italian film
 Le Chaos, a 2007 Arabic language film
 CHAOS (TV series), 2011
 "Chaos", a 1986 episode of The Transformers

Literature 
 Chaos, a 2016 novel by Patricia Cornwell
 Chaos, an 1898 novel by Alexander Shirvanzade
 Liber Chaos, an alchemical treatise by Ramon Llull
 Chaos: Making a New Science, a 1987 book by James Gleick
 CHAOS: Charles Manson, the CIA, and the Secret History of the Sixties, a 2019 book by Tom O'Neill with Dan Piepenbring
 "The Chaos", a poem by Gerard Nolst Trenité

Music 
 Chaos (Attila album), 2016
 Chaos (Paul Bley album), 1998
 The Chaos (album), by The Futureheads, 2010
 Chaos, an album by Rene Aubry, 2017
 Chaos, an album by Jaycee Chan, 2010
 Chaos, an album by Unlocking the Truth, 2016
 "CHAOS", a song by VIXX from the 2013 EP Hyde
 "Chaos", a 2007 song by Mutemath
 "Chaos", a song by Unkle from the 1998 album Psyence Fiction
 "Chaos", a song by Tim Sköld from the 1996 album Skold
 "Chaos", a song by Stump from the 1988 album A Fierce Pancake

Other uses in arts, entertainment and media 
 Chaos (journal), a scientific journal devoted to nonlinear systems
 Chaos: The Battle of Wizards, a 1985 video game
 Chaos, a cultural festival of the Indian Institute of Management, Ahmedabad
 Chaos! Comics, a comic book publisher (1994–2002)

Mythology, philosophy and religion 
 Chaos (cosmogony), in the Greek creation myths
 Chaos magic, a contemporary magical practice
 Symbol of Chaos

Science, technology and mathematics 
 Chaos (genus), a genus of amoebae
 19521 Chaos, an object in space
 Chaos terrain, an area of jumbled surface topography in planetary geology
 Chaos theory, a branch of mathematics
 CHAOS (operating system), a Linux distribution
 Quantum chaos, chaotic dynamical systems in quantum theory, quantum mechanics and their relation to classical chaos

Other uses 
 Chaos (professional wrestling), a professional wrestling alliance
 Chaos (roller coaster), in Nashville, Tennessee, U.S.
 Chaos.com, an Australian online retailer
 Chaos Lacrosse Club, an American professional men's field lacrosse team
 Chaos Reef, in the South Shetland Islands, Antarctica
 Chaos, a season in the Discordian calendar
 Operation CHAOS, a CIA domestic espionage project
 Rans S-9 Chaos, an American aerobatic aircraft design
 Chaos (company), a Bulgarian rendering and simulation software company

See also 
 
 
 Chao (disambiguation)
 Community Health Analytics Open Source Software (CHAOSS)
 Chaos Theory (disambiguation)
 KAOS (disambiguation)
 k-os (born 1972), a Canadian rapper
 New World Disorder (disambiguation)
 XaoS, an interactive fractal zoomer program